Newrene Claudine Klaaste is a South African politician serving as the Speaker of the Northern Cape Provincial Legislature since 22 May 2019. She has been a Member of the Provincial Legislature for the African National Congress (ANC) since 2019. Prior to serving in the provincial legislature, she was the Speaker of the Namakwa District Municipality.

References

External links
Newrene Claudine Klaaste – People's Assembly
Profile : Ms Newrene Claudine Klaaste – Northern Cape Provincial Legislature (NCPL)

African National Congress politicians
Members of the Northern Cape Provincial Legislature
Living people
People from the Northern Cape
Women legislative speakers
Year of birth missing (living people)